Operation Trinity may refer to:

Trinity (nuclear test)
 Operation Trinity Clerkenwell crime syndicate, First post cold war collaboration of Mi5 to investigate organised crime.